The eighteenth season of the American reality television series The Voice ran from February 24 to May 19, 2020, on NBC. Blake Shelton, Kelly Clarkson and John Legend returned as coaches for their eighteenth, fifth, and third season, respectively. Nick Jonas joined the panel for his first season as a new coach, replacing Gwen Stefani. Meanwhile, Carson Daly returned for his eighteenth season as host.

This is the third season in The Voice since seasons one and three where the team sizes was not 12, as it was reduced to ten. This is also the first season to have five artists compete in the finale, and the first time each coach would guarantee to have at least one artist representing in the finale since season two. For the first time since season two, artists are not awarded any multiplier bonuses for streams or iTunes downloads due to the performances being recorded away from the studios (except for the finals) as a measure against the ongoing COVID-19 pandemic.

Todd Tilghman was named the winner of the season, marking Blake Shelton's seventh win as a coach, making him the oldest winner to date in the show's history – following Josh Kaufman in the 6th season. For the first time, the first artist in the Blind Auditions went on to win the entire season.

During the finale, Daly foregoes the announcement of third place but instead proceeding to announce Tilghman winning the season, without revealing the final placements for Thunderstorm Artis or Toneisha Harris. However, through The Voice Twitter page, Harris was revealed to finish as runner-up, making her currently the highest-placed African American female singer in Voice history.

Coaches and hosts

In October 2019, it was announced that Nick Jonas would join the show as a coach for this season replacing Gwen Stefani who left the panel due to her Just a Girl Las Vegas Residency. This is his second appearance, as he was the Battle Advisor for the eighth season for Team Christina.  Blake Shelton returned for his eighteenth season as a coach, John Legend for his third, and Kelly Clarkson for her fifth. This is the twelfth season to feature three male coaches on the panel.

This season's advisors for the Battles are: Dua Lipa for Team Kelly, Joe and Kevin Jonas (Jonas Brothers) for Team Nick, Ella Mai for Team Legend, and Bebe Rexha (who was the coach for sixteenth season's Comeback Stage) for Team Blake.

James Taylor served as a mega-mentor for all teams during the Knockouts.

Teams
Color key

Blind auditions
Color key

Episode 1 (February 24)

Episode 2 (February 25)

Episode 3 (March 2)

Episode 4 (March 9)

Episode 5 (March 16)
The Coaches performed "Jealous" at the start of the show.

The Battles
The Battle Rounds started on March 23. The advisors for this round were Dua Lipa for Team Kelly, Joe and Kevin Jonas for Team Nick, Ella Mai for Team Legend, and Bebe Rexha for Team Blake. The coaches can steal one losing artist from other coaches and save one losing artist on their team. However, the team coach may only hit their button to save an artist after it is clear that no other coach is going to steal the artist. Artists who win their battle or are stolen by another coach advance to the Knockout Rounds.

Color key:

The Knockouts
In the Knockout Rounds, each coach can steal one losing artist from another team. Artists who win their knockout or are stolen by another coach advance to the Live Playoffs. James Taylor will be serving as a mega mentor for all teams in this round.

New this season, each saved artist from the Battle Rounds will go head-to-head in the first-ever Four-Way Knockout. Results for the Four-Way Knockout are decided by a public vote, with the winner announced during the first week of Live Shows.

Color key:

Live Remote Shows 
This season, the number of weeks of live shows was reduced to three, consisting of the Live Playoffs, the Semifinals, and the Finale.

As a result of the COVID-19 outbreak in the United States, the live shows were changed to remote shows with performances aired pre-recorded performances at the contestants' and coaches' homes. The Instant Save is done via The Voice Official App in the playoffs and semifinals, continuing the shift from Twitter to the Official App that took place in Season 17.

Additionally, the artists did not have available studio versions of their covers released on iTunes or Apple Music, meaning that for the first time since the introduction in season three, there were no streaming votes or bonuses awarded. However, the finalists did have studio versions of their original song and coach duet from the Finale released, although they did not contribute to the artists' vote tally.

Color key:

Week 1: Live Playoffs (May 4 & 5)

The Live Playoff round constituted episodes 12 and 13. For the first time there will be a Top 17. On Monday, James Taylor opened the show with a performance with the remaining Knockouts artists, followed by the announcement of the 4-Way Knockout Winner. The winner joined the Top 17, who all performed live from their homes using a production kit sent to them. Coaches mentored and gave feedback from their homes: Kelly from Montana, Blake from Oklahoma, and both John and Nick from Los Angeles.

On Tuesday's live episode, one artist from each team advanced based on America's vote, and each coach got to save one of their own artists. The remaining artists from each team with the highest votes will have a chance to compete for the Wild Card as seen on season 17. These nine artists advanced to the Semifinals.

Week 2: Semifinals (May 11 & 12) 

The Semifinals comprised episodes 14 and 15. On Monday, the Top 9 artists performed to the theme of “Dedication Week” with the public vote results being announced on Tuesday. Four artists are eliminated in a new elimination format: one artist from a team with a higher vote will immediately advance to the Top 5, leaving the remaining five artists to compete for the final spot in the finals via Instant Save.

With the advancement of Thunderstorm Artis to the finale, Nick Jonas became the fifth new coach to successfully coach an artist on his team to the finale on his first attempt as a coach, after Usher (Michelle Chamuel in season 4), Alicia Keys (Wé McDonald in season 11), Kelly Clarkson (Brynn Cartelli in season 14), and John Legend (Maelyn Jarmon in season 16).

Week 3: Finale (May 18 & 19) 
The final 5 performed on Monday, May 18, 2020, with the final results following on Tuesday, May 19, 2020. In the first episode of the Finale, each artist performed an original song and a cover. In the second episode, each artist performed a duet with their respective coach. For the first time this season, artists had studio versions of their performances released on iTunes and Apple Music, with each artist's original song and coach duet being released; However, unlike in previous seasons, a purchase or stream of these performances did not factor into voting.

Todd Tilghman from Team Blake became the first and the only vocalist of the season to reach top 10 on iTunes. His original song's studio recording hit #1 on iTunes Overall Chart and iTunes Country Chart. With both Tilghman and Harris finishing in top two, this marked Shelton's second (of his seven) victory in which two of these artists have been finished in the top two since season three (Cassadee Pope and Terry McDermott).

Elimination chart

Overall
Color key
Artist's info

Result details

Teams
Color key 
Artist's info

Results details

Artists who appeared on other shows or in previous seasons
 Emily Bass auditioned for season seventeen, but did not get a chair turn. She is the fourth contestant, after Sonia Rao, Odiseas Georgiadis, and Luna Searles to be rejected twice, the third to be rejected twice in different seasons, and the first to be rejected in back-to-back seasons.
 Zach Day auditioned for season thirteen of American Idol but was cut in the Hollywood Rounds.
 Brittney Allen appeared on season ten of America's Got Talent but was eliminated in the Judge Cuts Round.
 Arei Moon & Kailey Abel auditioned for season fifteen of American Idol, but were both cut in Hollywood.
 Samantha Howell auditioned for season seventeen of American Idol but was cut in the Hollywood Rounds. Unfortunately, her audition did not air.
 Toneisha Harris appeared on the 46th season of Saturday Night Live, she performed with Nick Jonas' "Spaceman" and "This Is Heaven".
 Allegra Miles appeared in season twenty of American Idol and made the Top 14.
 Megan Danielle and Michael Williams is set to appear in season twenty one of American Idol

Ratings

References

External links

2020 American television seasons
Season 18
Television series impacted by the COVID-19 pandemic